Sand and Blood is a 1988 French drama film directed by Jeanne Labrune. It was screened in the Un Certain Regard section at the 1988 Cannes Film Festival.

Cast
 Sami Frey - Manuel Vasquez
 André Dussollier - Francisco Jimenez
 Clémentine Célarié - Marion
 María Casares - Dolores
 Catherine Rouvel - Carmina
 Pierre Forget - Le Père
 Camille Grandville - Annie
 Stéphane Albouy - Mario

References

External links

1988 films
1988 drama films
French drama films
1980s French-language films
Films directed by Jeanne Labrune
Bullfighting films
1980s French films